J. Paul Compton Jr. is an American lawyer who is General Counsel at the United States Department of Housing and Urban Development. Prior to assuming his current role, he was a partner at Bradley Arant Boult Cummings.

Compton attended the University of Alabama as an undergraduate. He was named a Truman Scholar in 1983. He graduated summa cum laude in 1985 and was named the College of Commerce's Outstanding Student the same year. He received his J.D. from the University of Virginia School of Law. After graduating from law school, he joined the law firm of Bradley Arant Boult Cummings in 1989, where he eventually became a partner and chairman of the finance committee. He advised banks and other financial institutions about investing in affordable housing and community development projects.

He is outside General Counsel to the Alabama Affordable Housing Association and a member and former state chairman of the American Bar Association Forum on Affordable Housing and Community Development. He is also on the board of directors of the Truman Scholars Association.

References

External links
 Biography at Bradley Arant Boult Cummings LLP 

Living people
21st-century American lawyers
University of Alabama alumni
Trump administration personnel
University of Virginia School of Law alumni
United States Department of Housing and Urban Development officials
Year of birth missing (living people)